Nikolas Antoniou (born 20 January 2004) is a Cypriot swimmer. He competed in the men's 100 metre freestyle at the 2020 Summer Olympics.

References

External links
 

2004 births
Living people
Cypriot male swimmers
Cypriot male freestyle swimmers
Olympic swimmers of Cyprus
Swimmers at the 2020 Summer Olympics
21st-century Cypriot people